Mu Xin may refer to:

 Fu Hao (  1200 BC), posthumously known as Mu Xin, a wife of King Wu Ding of the Shang dynasty
 Mu Xin (artist) (1927–2011), Chinese painter, calligrapher and writer